K. maculata may refer to:

 Karatausia maculata, a jewel beetle
 Kassina maculata, a running frog